Susayqışlaq (also, Susaykyshlak and Susaykyshlakh) is a village and municipality in the Khachmaz Rayon of Azerbaijan.  It has a population of 1,303.  The municipality consists of the villages of Susayqışlaq and Pərdiqıran.

References 

Populated places in Khachmaz District